Miandoab (also Romanized as Mīāndoāb) is a village in Balvard Rural District, in the Central District of Sirjan County, Kerman Province, Iran. At the 2006 census, its population was 19, in 5 families.

References 

Populated places in Sirjan County